Dobova railway station is the principal railway station in Dobova, Slovenia. It is a border station with Croatia.

References

External links 
Official site of the Slovenian railways 

Railway stations in Slovenia